The Santa Clara River Trail is a paved bicycle and walking path in the city of Santa Clarita, California.

A north-south fork connects to the community of Newhall. The trail is generally flat with very gentle elevation. There are many jumping off points along the path providing access to neighborhoods, parks and commerce. On the western end, the path connects to an extensive network of paths, trails and elevated bridges called paseos that are independent of automobile roadway in Valencia.  

The main trail and its feeders are in close proximity and provide easy access to all three Metrolink stations located within the city limits.  These stations are Newhall, Santa Clarita and Via Princessa.  Bicycle locker facilities are available at all three stations.

Future plans
City planners have placed a high priority on adding to the network of bike trails throughout the city as part of the approval process for future development. According to the trail's website, there are plans to extend the western end or the trail from Edison Curve to Interstate 5 near the Montalvo Branch railroad bridge.

According to the Santa Clarita Pedestrian and Bike Master Plan, its goal is to encourage more people to bike and walk for everyday needs by providing more accessible bikeways, trails, and paseos.

References

External links
SCV Bicycling: Commuter Rail Trail
MAP BikeSantaClarita.com Off-Street Bike Trail Map
TrailLink

Bike paths in Los Angeles
Protected areas of Los Angeles County, California
Santa Clarita, California
Rail trails in California